The 9 October 2009 Peshawar bombing was a minibus bomb that was detonated at the crowded Khyber Bazaar in Peshawar on 9 October 2009 killing 41 and injuring at least 100.

See also
List of terrorist incidents in Pakistan since 2001
List of terrorist incidents, 2009

References

21st-century mass murder in Pakistan
History of Peshawar
Mass murder in 2009
Suicide car and truck bombings in Pakistan
Terrorist incidents in Pakistan in 2009
Terrorist incidents in Peshawar